The 2009–10 PlusLiga was the 74th season of the Polish Volleyball Championship, the 10th season as a professional league organized by the Professional Volleyball League SA under the supervision of the Polish Volleyball Federation.

PGE Skra Bełchatów won their 6th title of the Polish Champions.

Regular season

|}

Playoffs
(to 3 victories)

Final standings

External links
 Official website 

PlusLiga
PlusLiga
PlusLiga
PlusLiga
PlusLiga